The 2015–16 Intercity Football League is the ninth season of the Intercity Football League since its establishment in 2007. The season began on 16 May 2015, Taiwan Power Company are the defending champions.

Clubs
A total of 11 clubs will contest the league.

Preliminary stage
The preliminary stages were held from May 16 to 18, 2015. All matches are held in Bailing Stadium.

Round one

The top two teams qualified to "Round Two".

Round two
The preliminary stages were held from August 14 to 16, 2015. All matches were held in Yonghua Stadium.

The top two teams qualified to the Intercity League.

Final round

The winners from Round 2 plus 6 best teams in 2014 season, will compete for the championship.

The league starts at September 13, 2015, and will end on April 23, 2016.

References

External links
Chinese Taipei Football Association
FIFA.com standings
Soccerway: Inter City League 2014

Top level Taiwanese football league seasons
Intercity Football League seasons
Taipei
1
2016 in Taiwanese football